The Wilshire Beverly Center is a landmark building in Beverly Hills, California.

Location
The building is located on the corner of Wilshire Boulevard and Beverly Drive in the City of Beverly Hills. The exact address is 9465 on Wilshire Boulevard.

History
It was designed in the International Style by renowned architect Victor Gruen (1903-1980) and completed in 1962. It was built by the Buckeye Construction Company, whose founder and CEO was George Konheim (1917–2001). It spans 184,000 square feet over nine floors.

Underneath the building, there are three levels of subterranean parking. In the context of the Cold War, they were also meant to enable 4,000 people to live there for fourteen days in the event of a nuclear attack.

Over the years, it has been home to the largest Bank of America branch in the United States. Additionally, it has been the headquarters of airline companies and a medical center. It currently houses Chase bank, among other tenants.

References

Buildings and structures in Beverly Hills, California
Commercial buildings completed in 1962
International style architecture in California